Punkinhead, "the sad little bear", was a rubbery toy bear with a tuft of unruly orange hair. He was designed and developed into a storybook character by Canadian cartoonist Charles Thorson. The bears were manufactured by Merrythought company.

Punkinhead was the main character in a series of children's books published by the T. Eaton Company, a large department store in Toronto, Ontario.  To promote the sale of the stuffed bear and the books, the store created a song about him and sold recordings of it.

Punkinhead became associated with Eaton's Christmas advertising. In 1947, Punkinhead appeared in Toronto's Santa Claus parade.  The character also appeared on many of Eaton's toys, accessories and clothing. Among them were kitchenware items such as bowls and mugs, furniture such as chairs and rocking horses, and clothing such as toques and mittens.

The Punkinhead doll and books have become collectors' items.

Books
Punkinhead, the Sad Little Bear
Punkinhead in Santa's Workshop, 1950
Punkinhead and the Christmas Party, 1952
Punkinhead and His Toy Workshop Adventure, 1954
Punkinhead in Animal Valley, 1955
Punkinhead and Jock the Jumper, 1960

References

Further reading

Series of children's books
Canadian children's books
Characters in children's literature
Teddy bears
Fiction about toys